Amne Samne is a 1982 Indian Hindi-language film directed by Ashim Samanta and starring Mithun Chakraborty in a dual role, alongside Bindiya Goswami, Aarti Gupta, Tarun Ghosh, Dinesh Thakur, Kamal Kapoor and Leela Mishra in important roles. This film little bit resembles on Sachaa Jhutha.

Plot
Gopi (Mithun Chakraborty) is a simple-minded villager who travels to Mumbai looking for a job. He is approached by some men who mistake him for Johnny (also Mithun Chakraborty). Johnny is a criminal who works for the underworld don Supremo (Kamal Kapoor) and is also a stage performer by day to cover up his criminal activities. When he meets his lookalike, Johnny decides to use him as a fall guy in case the police discover who he is. Gopi is trained into becoming Johnny to convincingly impersonate him, unknowingly becoming an accomplice to Johnny's crimes. When the police discover Johnny has stolen valuable statues, Gopi is blamed and must prove his innocence to everyone.

Cast
Mithun Chakraborty as Gopi / Johny (Dual Role)
Bindiya Goswami as CBI Inspector Jyoti
Aarti Gupta as Rita
Leela Mishra as Gopi's Grandmother
Kamal Kapoor as Supremo
Dinesh Thakur as Police Commissioner Ashraf Khan

Soundtrack

References

External links
 

1982 films
1980s Hindi-language films
Films scored by R. D. Burman
Films directed by Ashim Samanta